German Anatolyevich Skurygin (September 15, 1963 – November 28, 2008) was a Russian race walker. He was born in Vutno.

He originally won a gold medal at the 1999 World Championships, but later lost it due to doping. He was suspended from 1999 to 2001. Like dozens of other elite Russian race walkers suspended for doping, he was coached by Viktor Chegin. He died of a heart attack at 45.

International competitions

See also
List of doping cases in athletics

References

1963 births
2008 deaths
Russian male racewalkers
World Athletics Championships medalists
Athletes stripped of World Athletics Championships medals
Russian Athletics Championships winners
Russian sportspeople in doping cases
Doping cases in athletics